The Japan Grand Prix was an annual professional wrestling tournament held by the promotion All Japan Women's Pro-Wrestling (AJW) to determine the number one contender for the promotion's highest achievement, the WWWA World Single Championship.  The tournament was held in the summer every year from 1985 to 2004.  In 2005, AJW was closed for good, and the WWWA Championship was abandoned.

List of winners

Results

1985
The 1985 Japan Grand Prix was a 10-woman round-robin tournament concluding on June 25, 1985.

1986
The 1985 Japan Grand Prix was a 12-woman round-robin tournament concluding on June 22, 1986.

1987
The 1987 Japan Grand Prix was a 13-woman round-robin tournament concluding on June 28, 1987.

1988
The 1988 Japan Grand Prix was an 11-woman round-robin tournament concluding on June 26, 1988.

1989
The 1989 Japan Grand Prix was a 19-woman single-elimination tournament held from June 25 to August 24, 1989.

1990
The 1990 Japan Grand Prix was a seven-woman single-elimination tournament concluding on June 17, 1990.

1991
The 1991 Japan Grand Prix was a 16-woman single-elimination tournament held from July 7 to August 18, 1991.

1992
The 1992 Japan Grand Prix was a round-robin tournament consisting of two 10-woman blocks, held from June 27 to August 30, 1992.

1993
The 1993 Japan Grand Prix was a round-robin tournament consisting of two eight-woman blocks, with the top two finishers from each block advancing to a single-elimination tournament. It was held from May 3 to August 21, 1993.

1994
The 1994 Japan Grand Prix was a 10-woman round-robin tournament held from June 3 to August 28, 1994.

1995
The 1995 Japan Grand Prix was a 16-woman round-robin tournament, consisting of two eight-woman blocks, concluding on September 3, 1995.

1996
The 1996 Japan Grand Prix was a 12-woman round-robin tournament held from July 14 to August 30, 1996.

1997
The 1997 Japan Grand Prix was a 12-woman round-robin tournament concluding on August 10, 1997.

† These scores are not the actual scores. These wrestlers had one match with the results unknown.

1998
The 1998 Japan Grand Prix was a round-robin tournament consisting of two six-woman blocks, with the top three finishers from the Main League and the top finisher from the Junior League advancing to a single-elimination tournament. It was held from June 14 to August 9, 1998.

1999
The 1999 Japan Grand Prix was a nine-woman round-robin tournament, with the second, third and fourth finishers advancing to a second round-robin. The winner of the second round-robin advanced to face the first-place finisher from the initial round-robin. The tournament was held from June 6 to August 15, 1999.

2000
The 2000 Japan Grand Prix was a nine-woman single-elimination tournament held from June 11 to August 20, 2000. Also a six-woman Junior Division round-robin tournament was held.

Main league

21st Century League

2001
The 2001 Japan Grand Prix was a 12-woman round-robin tournament held from June 1 to August 17, 2001.

2002
The 2002 Japan Grand Prix was a nine-woman round-robin tournament held from May 25 to July 9, 2002. The top four finishers advanced to a single-elimination tournament.

2003
The 2003 Japan Grand Prix was a 10-woman single-elimination tournament held from July 20 to August 3, 2003.

2004
The 2004 Japan Grand Prix was a 10-woman single-elimination tournament held on August 1, 2004.

See also
All Japan Women's Pro-Wrestling
Tag League the Best
G1 Climax
Champion Carnival
Global League

References

All Japan Women's Pro-Wrestling
Women's professional wrestling tournaments